Telly Leung is an American actor, director, singer and songwriter. He is known for his work in musical theatre on Broadway and for his role as Wes, a member of the Dalton Academy Warblers on the Fox comedy-drama series Glee. In 2011, he starred in the Broadway revival of Godspell at the Circle in the Square Theatre.

Leung was named one of 12 Faces to Watch in 2012: Dance, Theater, Architecture, and Art by the Los Angeles Times.

Early life and education
Leung was born and raised in New York City. He grew up in a traditional Chinese home in Bay Ridge, Brooklyn. He gained admission into New York's prestigious Stuyvesant High School, from which he graduated in 1998, alongside fellow actor Malcolm Barrett. It was at Stuyvesant that Leung seriously pursued theater, performing in high school productions of Pippin, Guys & Dolls, and West Side Story. His first professional job was as a featured performer in THE WB-TEAM 11, doing live and television promotional work for the WB Channel 11. After high school, Leung was accepted into Carnegie Mellon University's School of Drama.

Acting career
During the summers off from college, Leung earned his Equity Card performing at the Pittsburgh Civic Light Opera and The MUNY in St. Louis. He worked with directors and choreographers including Tony Award winner Thommie Walsh, Larry Fuller, and Lee Roy Reams. It was also at CMU that he met fellow Broadway performer Billy Porter, who returned to his alma mater to direct the main stage production of Stephen Sondheim's Company. After casting Leung as Bobby in Company, Porter telephoned colleagues involved in the Broadway revival of Flower Drum Song and landed Leung an audition.
 

In the fall of 2002, Leung made his Broadway debut in the revival of Flower Drum Song, starring Lea Salonga, as a member of the ensemble and an understudy for Wang Ta. He later worked on Broadway with Sondheim in Roundabout Theatre's revival of Pacific Overtures in 2005. After Pacific Overtures, Leung originated the role of Boq in the Chicago company of the Stephen Schwartz musical Wicked. He moved back to New York in 2006 to take part in the Paper Mill Playhouse production of Godspell. He then returned to Broadway and performed as an ensemble member in the final run of Rent.

In 2007, he guest starred in an episode of Law & Order: Criminal Intent. Leung was a member of the final company of Rent – and made his film debut as part of the ensemble in Rent: Filmed Live on Broadway. He had a recurring role in the musical comedy-drama series Glee from 2010 to 2011, portraying the role of Wes, a member of the Dalton Academy Warblers.

Leung appeared in the Broadway revival of Godspell at the Circle in the Square Theatre. He reprised his role from the Paper Mill production as the "All Good Gifts" soloist. He was a featured performer in the world premiere of the musical Allegiance at the Old Globe Theatre in San Diego. The production premiered in September 2012, with Lea Salonga and George Takei also in the cast. In 2014, Leung appeared in the play The World of Extreme Happiness at Goodman Theatre in Chicago. He went on to star in the co-production at the Manhattan Theatre Club in February 2015.

In October 2015, Leung returned to Broadway in the musical Allegiance at the Longacre Theatre alongside co-stars George Takei and Lea Salonga. He then went on to perform in the acapella musical In Transit. Leung played the titular character of the Broadway production of Aladdin, having started his run on June 13, 2017.

In 2022, Telly directed Theatre Raleigh's production of Yellow Face.

Music career
In 2005, Leung released an original EP titled Getaway on Mopptopp Records. His first solo LP, I'll Cover You, was released on December 4, 2012 through Yellow Sound. Leung is a featured performer on the cast recordings of Godspell, Flower Drum Song, Pacific Overtures, Dear Edwina, and Wall to Wall Sondheim.

Personal life
Leung, who is gay, married James Babcock in December 2016.

Notable roles

Discography
Studio albums
 Songs for You (2015)
 I'll Cover You (2012)

Extended plays
 Getaway (2005)

Singles
 "New York State of Mind" (2015)

Cast albums
 Godspell (2011)
 Sweet Bye and Bye (2011)
 Dear Edwina (2008)
 Wall to Wall Sondheim (2006)
 Pacific Overtures (2005)

References

External links

 
 

21st-century American male actors
American male actors of Chinese descent
American male film actors
American male musical theatre actors
American musicians of Chinese descent
American male television actors
Carnegie Mellon University College of Fine Arts alumni
American LGBT people of Asian descent
American LGBT singers
American gay musicians
American gay actors
Living people
Male actors from New York (state)
Stuyvesant High School alumni
1980 births